Synagogues: Transformation and Renewal (STAR) is a Jewish advocacy organization to support synagogues in the United States.

Overview
It was founded in 2000 by businessman Edgar Bronfman, businessman Charles Schusterman, and investor Michael Steinhardt. It is headquartered in St. Louis Park, Minnesota. Lynn Schusterman, the co-founder's widow, is Chairwoman of the Board.

The organization pledged to give $18 million the first year. Participants in the inaugural summit in Chicago included Rabbi and author Shmuley Boteach, Professor Richard Joel, and Koret Foundation interim director Mel Mogulof. They donate $500,000 to synagogues in the United States every year.

In 2009, together with the Center for Jewish Policy Studies, it helped publish Synagogues in a Time of Change: Fragmentation and Diversity in Jewish Religious Movements by Zachary I. Heller.

References

Jewish organizations established in 2000
Jewish organizations based in the United States
2000 establishments in the United States